Inadmissible Evidence is a 1968 British drama film directed by Anthony Page and starring Nicol Williamson and Jill Bennett. John Osborne wrote the screenplay, adapting his own 1964 play Inadmissible Evidence. The film portrays the collapse of an angry but sad man who cannot maintain decent standards in his life and antagonises everybody. As with other Osborne plays, it is possible to see his descent as representative of his class, culture and nation.

Plot
The film follows a couple of days in the life of Bill Maitland, a 39-year-old Englishman who is head of small law firm in London and is tortured by his inadequacies as a lawyer, as an employer, as a husband, as a father, as a friend (he has none) and as a lover (for though women succumb quickly to him, he cannot maintain a relationship). Punctuated by interior monologues and imagined scenes, it shows him being abandoned by everybody as they come to realise that they cannot rely on him.

He first loses his secretary and lover Shirley, who walks out of her job and his life. His chief clerk Hudson then reveals that he is off to join a rival firm, leaving only the trainee Jones, who scorns him. A client, Mrs Gamsey,  leaves the office in tears and is unlikely to return. After a dinner party at which he gets drunk and insults her best friends, his wife Anna hits him and he leaves the marital home. His mistress Liz takes him in, getting insulted for her pains, and he then leaves her to sleep in the office.

A client (and former lover), Mrs Anderson, has a court hearing that morning at which his feeble defence will probably lose her the case. A new client, Mr Maples, distressed that Maitland seems to take no serious interest in his sad case, walks out in tears. His daughter Jane drops in at his request, only to leave after a tirade of insults. The receptionist Joy, who he has just started an affair with, coldly rejects him and leaves. Liz appears, looking for reconciliation, but after being brutally rejected leaves.

Haunted throughout by fears of being disqualified for malpractice, of being arrested and held in jail, of being tried in court, of dying and being cremated, now utterly alone in life he smashes a window and looks at the busy street below.

Main Cast
 Nicol Williamson - Bill Maitland 
 Eleanor Fazan - Anna Maitland 
 Ingrid Boulting – Jane Maitland
 Jill Bennett - Liz Eaves
 Eileen Atkins - Shirley
 Gillian Hills - Joy
 Peter Sallis - Hudson 
 David Valla - Jones 
 Isabel Dean - Mrs. Garnsey 
 Clare Kelly - Mrs. Anderson
 John Normington – Maples

Production
Nicol Williamson sings two songs in the film: "Room 504" and "Moonlight Becomes You."

Critical reception
The New York Times wrote, "As a study of harrowing pressures that destroy a middle-aged, weak but complex human being, Inadmissible Evidence gives the satisfaction that comes from viewing a carefully crafted work...Anthony Page, who directed the play, gives the movie's principals the focus they need. Under his guidance they act and talk like people, not puppets. Of course, Mr. Williamson does most of it with shattering constancy and reality"; while Variety wrote, "As a play, the best thing about Inadmissible Evidence was Nicol Williamson, who brought to life the tormented, mediocre, bullying coward that John Osborne had conceived on paper. Same holds true for the screen version in which same actor appears. There is value and insight to the film. Yet much of it is opaque and confusing. Evidence remains primarily a play" ; while Time Out wrote, "The main problem is the intrusive camera/editing style which reduces the original lengthy diatribes to tetchy little snippets, simultaneously cutting Osborne's magnificently theatrical anti-hero down to size: instead of being effectively inside a man's mind, we are now left outside, wondering why we should be expected to sympathise with such an unprepossessing, self-centred bore."

References

Bibliography
 Murphy, Robert. Sixties British Cinema. British Film Industry, 1992.

External links

1968 films
British drama films
1968 drama films
Films directed by Anthony Page
British films based on plays
Films based on works by John Osborne
Films set in London
1960s English-language films
1960s British films